Anomis vulpicolor is a moth of the family Erebidae. It was first described by Edward Meyrick in 1928. It is endemic to the Hawaiian islands of Oahu, Molokai and Hawaii.

The larvae feed on Osteomeles anthyllidifolia. The caterpillar has four pairs of abdominal prolegs.

External links

Catocalinae
Endemic moths of Hawaii
Moths described in 1928